The Kandurata Warriors is a Twenty20 cricket team that competes in the Sri Lanka Premier League, representing Central Province. Somerset Entertainment Ventures (S) Pte Ltd purchased the team for $5.32 million in 2012. They were owned for seven years, after which a new agreement may be negotiated.

History
Australian player Adam Voges did not play in the SLPL 2012 due to pressure from his current team Nottinghamshire. Although Voges, the former Australia international who has played in the IPL and more recently for Melbourne Stars in the Big Bash League, is listed as one of eight overseas players on the roster of the Kandurata franchise, Notts insisted his obligations at Trent Bridge will be met in full.

Current squad
Players with international caps are listed in bold.

References

External links
Team site on ESPN CricInfo

Sri Lanka Premier League teams
Sports clubs in Sri Lanka
Cricket clubs established in 2012
Sports clubs disestablished in 2012
2012 establishments in Sri Lanka
Cricket in Kandy
Sport in Kandy